Meydanak-e Bozorg (also Romanized as Meydānak-e Bozorg; also known as Maldānak Bāla, Meydānak, Meydānak Bālā, Meydānak-e Avval, and Meydānak-e Bālā) is a village in Ashayer Rural District, in the Central District of Fereydunshahr County, Isfahan Province, Iran. At the 2006 census, its population was 317, in 73 families.

References 

Populated places in Fereydunshahr County